Many large local government councils in the United Kingdom have a system of area committees or area boards, which involve local people and organisations in decisions affecting council spending within their area. They cover a geographical area such as a group of parishes, one or more electoral wards, or a local authority district.

References 

Politics of the United Kingdom
Types of subdivision in the United Kingdom